The Union Danu League for Democracy Party (UDLD) was a political party in Myanmar.

History
Following the reintroduction of multi-party democracy after the 8888 Uprising, the party contested four seats in the 1990 general elections. It received 0.17% of the vote, winning one seat; U Myint Than in Kalaw.

The party was banned by the military government on 13 February 1992.

References

Defunct political parties in Myanmar
1992 disestablishments in Myanmar
Political parties disestablished in 1992